Jerik is a tiny lunar impact crater in the southeastern part of the Mare Serenitatis. It is located to the northeast of the small crater Dawes, and to the west of the Montes Taurus range. To the east-northeast of this position is the landing site of the Apollo 17 mission, in the Taurus–Littrow valley.

Next to Jerik is an even smaller (~100 m), unnamed crater with a bright ray system.
The name of the crater was approved by the IAU in 1976, and refers to a Scandinavian male given name.

References

External links
 LTO-42C3 Dawes —  L&PI topographic map of area.
Jerik at The Moon Wiki

Impact craters on the Moon